The 2014 OFC Women's Nations Cup (also known as the 2014 OFC Women's Championship) was the 10th edition of the OFC Women's Nations Cup, and took place in Papua New Guinea from 25 to 29 October 2014. The football tournament was organised by the Oceania Football Confederation. It was the tenth edition of the tournament.

New Zealand won the tournament without conceding a goal, thus winning their third straight edition and qualifying to the 2015 Women's World Cup.

Hosts
Papua New Guinea and New Zealand had submitted a bid for the tournament. Papua New Guinea was chosen at the OFC Executive Committee on 29 March 2014. Papua New Guinea had hosted the 2007 edition previously.

Teams
All eleven OFC members were eligible to participate but only four entered teams.

Venue
Matches were originally to be played at the Sir Ignatius Kilage Stadium in Lae. However, the venue was later changed to the Kalabond Oval in Kokopo.

Format
Teams played each other once in a round-robin tournament. The best placed team qualified to the 2015 FIFA World Cup.

Squads

Matches
All times are local (UTC+10:00).

Awards
The following awards were given at the conclusion of the tournament.

Goalscorers
New Zealand's Amber Hearn won the top scorer award for the second tournament in a row.

7 goals
 Amber Hearn

5 goals
 Helen Collins

4 goals
 Meagen Gunemba

3 goals

 Sarah Gregorius
 Annalie Longo
 Rosie White

2 goals

 Daisy Cleverley
 Betsy Hassett
 Ria Percival
 Rebekah Stott
 Marie Kaipu

1 goal

 Lee Maoate-Cox
 Tepaeru Toka
 Abby Erceg
 Sandra Birum
 Heilala Loto'aniu

References

External links
OFC Women's Nations Cup 2014, oceaniafootball.com

Women's Nations Cup
2014
2014 in Papua New Guinean sport
2014 in women's association football
2015 FIFA Women's World Cup qualification
2014 OFC Women's Nations Cup
2014–15 in New Zealand association football
2014 in Tongan sport
Football